Overseas Singaporeans refers to citizens or people who identify as a nation with the sovereign island city-state of Singapore that are living outside the borders of Singapore. Most Singaporeans overseas are high-income expatriates bringing their expertise or skills to other countries while accompanied by their families or students temporarily studying abroad.

According to the United Nations Department of Economic and Social Affairs in 2019, the population of the Singaporean diaspora stands at 340,751 and according to official statistics from the Government of Singapore, 217,200 of Singaporeans overseas continues to retain their citizenship. Most of the Singaporean diaspora are generally located in Malaysia, Australia, the United Kingdom, the United States, Indonesia and China.

Overview 
Most Singaporeans abroad are high-income expatriates accompanied by their families as professionals are sought after in various industries in regions such as China, India, the Middle East, Malaysia, Vietnam and Indonesia, as they are bilingual and highly skilled. Other reasons for living abroad includes students seeking to study in overseas universities or Singaporeans that settled in the home countries of their foreign spouses. 

The population of the Singaporean diaspora was at 156,468 in 1990, with the United Kingdom having the largest community of Singaporeans at 33,320 and the second largest in Malaysia, with a population of 31,269. In 2000, the population of the diaspora increased to 192,989, which was a 23.3% increase since 1990. In the same year, the number of Singaporeans in Malaysia increased to 44,779 individuals, surpassing the community in the United Kingdom, which had a population of 39,131. From 2000 to 2015, the number of Singaporeans moving abroad increased to 314,281 individuals. By 2019, there were 340,751 overseas Singaporeans, with 123,551 individuals holding other nationalities.

Most Singaporeans living abroad rarely renounce their citizenship and continues to keep strong ties to the country; there were only an average of 1,000 Singaporeans renouncing their citizenship annually. Furthermore, Singaporean students living abroad increasingly have plans to return to Singapore after completing their studies in countries such as Australia, New Zealand, the United Kingdom and the United States.

According to a 2016 survey conducted by the Institute of Policy Studies, 69.7% of Singaporeans aged between 19 and 30 stated that they could achieve the goals they have without migrating and 62.6% "preferred to improve" their socioeconomic well-being without migrating.

Factors 
According to a 2014 survey conducted by Singapore Polytechnic, some of the top reasons why Singaporeans would go abroad were to "increase their spending, find more opportunities overseas for work and education, or have a slower pace of life". Other factors include having different lifestyles, such as having access to more outdoor natural recreational activities in other countries (e.g. backpacking, camping, hiking and skiing).

Notable people
This is a list of notable people of Singaporean origin that includes people who were born or raised in Singapore and Singaporeans living abroad.

Politics 
 Ian Goodenough – Australian politician
 Michael Chan, Baron Chan – British physician and politician
 Peter Whish-Wilson – Australian politician
 Wan Azizah Wan Ismail – Malaysian politician and Former Deputy Prime Minister of Malaysia
 Francis Seow – Singaporean politician and lawyer
 Devan Nair – Former President of Singapore

Business 

 Desney Tan – Singaporean researcher working for Microsoft Research, based in the United States
 Victoria Chan-Palay – Singaporean neuroscientist, former American citizen
 Nancy Lam – Singaporean chef based in the United Kingdom
 Patrick Grove – Australian entrepreneur, co-founder of Catcha Group
 John Burton-Race – British Michelin starred chef
 Quek Leng Chan – Malaysian tycoon, co-founder of Hong Leong Group Malaysia
 Brandon Wade – American businessman, of Singaporean descent

Arts, Entertainment, and Sports 

 Boey Kim Cheng – Australian poet
 Paddy Boom – American professional drummer
 Ross Butler – Singaporean-born American actor
 Chin Han – Singaporean Hollywood actor
 Anna Cummer – Canadian actress
 Amanda Lee Koe – Singaporean-American novelist
 Kevin Kwan – American novelist
 Kygo – Singaporean-born Norwegian DJ
 Julia Nickson – Singaporean-born American actor
 Allan Massie – Scottish journalist, columnist, sports writer and novelist
 Vanessa-Mae – British violinist
 Jonathan Seet – Canadian singer-songwriter, composer and producer
 Wilfred Skinner – Singaporean national athlete, migrated to Canada
 Tan Kheng Hua – Singaporean Hollywood actress, producer and beauty queen
 Louis Theroux – British-American filmmaker 
 Astra Sharma – Australian tennis player
 Sharon Tay – American journalist and former host
 Gwendoline Yeo – Singaporean Hollywood actress

References

Notes

External links 
 Overseas Singaporean Unit official website

Singaporean diaspora
 Overseas